Herky may refer to:
 A character in the Jay Jay the Jet Plane children's story series
Herky the Hawk, the mascot of the University of Iowa